Thihapate or Thihapatei was a royal, official and military title.

Royalty
 Thihapate of Sagaing: King of Sagaing (r. 1352−64)
 Thihapate of Yamethin: governor of Yamethin (r. 1330s−40s)

Governors
 Thihapate of Tagaung: governor of Tagaung (r.  1367−1400), also known as Nga Nauk Hsan
 Thihapate II of Taungdwin: governor of Taungdwin (r. –)
 Thihapate III of Taungdwin: governor of Taungdwin (r. –1441)
 Thihapate of Mohnyin: sawbwa of Mohnyin (r. 1442−1450/51)

Generals
 Ne Myo Thihapate:  Early Konbaung period general

Burmese royal titles